Skikda is a district in Skikda Province, Algeria. It was named after its capital, Skikda. The current district chief is Mrs. Bouhmatou Nassima, being one of few administrative divisions of the country ruled by a woman.

History
The modern district has its roots in the colonial arrondissement of Philippeville (Philippeville is the former name of Skikda). Philippeville was first a sous-direction, then a sous-préfecture of the département of Constantine.

Municipalities
The district is further divided into 3 municipalities:
Skikda
Hamadi Krouma
Fil Fila

Districts of Skikda Province